Krambambula is a Belarusian alcoholic mix drink or cocktail that typically consists of red wine and various kinds of liquor, including gin, vodka, or rum. There are many different recipes. Commercially produced versions may also be available in some areas.

Etymology
The name is probably derived from the Old High German word Kranawitu or chranawita ("croaker timber," another name for juniper) and from the Rotwelsch word Blamp (alcoholic drink).

History

A red-colored cherry liqueur called Krambambuli was formerly produced by a distillery in Danzig (Gdańsk) established by Ambrosius Vermöllen, a Mennonite immigrant from De Lier in Holland, who received Danzig citizenship on 6 July 1598.

See also
 Medovukha

References

External links
 Krambambula marketed by BELPI - Belarusian Beverages.

Belarusian liqueurs
Polish liqueurs